The Naseem Cup was an association football competition run by the Yemen Football Association (YFA). It lasted for two seasons before being dissolved.

Al-Tilal won both editions that were played.

Finals

External links 
 Naseem Cup results RSSSF

Defunct football cup competitions in Yemen